The Old Souls Band
| origin          Rochester, New York, USA
| genre           = RockBlues-rockFunkPunk rockJam BandExperimental
| years_active    = 2018–Present  
| website oldsoulsband.com            = 
| current_members = Brody Schenk, Noah Lester, Jackson Wade, and Trevor 
The Old Souls are an American rock band.

The band formed in 2018, with guitarist and vocalist Brody Schenk, bassist Jackson Wade, drummer Noah Lester, and saxophonist Trevor Smith.

the band continues to perform and bring old music into a new generation. The band also has a collection of original songs, but all of them have yet to be released publicly.

Band history

Formation 
In Winter of 2018, Greg Detwiler connected high school students Noah Lester and Brody Schenk. Noah Lester (drums) and Brody Schenk (guitar) looked to start a band.  Jackson Wade, (a bass player who attended the same school as Brody) was asked if he would play in the newly formed band. With some hesitation, Jackson said yes. The trio practiced in the coming months, and played their first show at  Johnny’s on open mic night. After getting a few performances under their belts, the boys invited saxophone player Trevor Smith to play in the band. At first, Trevor was a part time member and only played a few songs with the band. However, over time, Trevor learned more of the band’s music and played more songs with them.  Soon, the four boys were performing together, and became collectively known as the Old Souls.

The Old Souls Band continues to perform around the local Rochester area. Upcoming show dates can be found on their website and on their Facebook. Their recognition and identify is ever-growing in the Rochester music scene.

Career
The band plays shows all throughout Rochester at local bars, restaurants, and venues.

The band has never released an album. The closest thing to albums are YouTube videos. These videos can be found on “The Old Souls” YouTube channel, or the “Old Souls Archives” YouTube channel. There are also various recordings of full shows on the band’s website, Facebook page, and Instagram.

Discography
It has been rumored that the band is planning on releasing a live album in the near future, but nothing has been confirmed.

Reviews
... "The next band that was presented to the fans was another young group, with the members all apparently in high school. The Old Souls Band, they were called. Old souls indeed! These classy cats are the bees knees, baby! Playing fun rock ‘n’ roll with a jazzy psychedelic twist, they absolutely crushed their cover of “Another Brick in the Wall”. About halfway through the set we were graced with one of the best alto sax solos I’ve ever witnessed live in my life. The bass player had incredible form and the licks he played were memorable to say the least. The drummer is one of the best young drummers I’ve seen, and it is clear that he not only has the knowledge of jazz, but it lives in his soul. And that guitarist, oh boy! Such passion, such pain, his face says it all when he’s bending those notes. Exemplary performance!"

Musical groups from Los Angeles